KKMO (1360 AM) is a commercial radio station located in Tacoma, Washington.

Programming
KKMO airs a Regional Mexican music format branded as "El Rey". Notable on-air personalities include nationally syndicated host Eddie "Piolin" Sotelo on mornings and local hosts the rest of the broadcast day. The station is the flagship Spanish broadcaster for the Seattle Mariners.

History
This station prevented KMOX in St. Louis, Missouri, from taking a "preferred" callsign.  This station used the KMO callsign from 1922 to 1983. The KMO calls would sometimes create confusion between KMO & Seattle's ABC affiliate KOMO in areas along the Sea-Tac strip, the Green River valley & the area around Olympia, Washington.

On May 25, 1932, the Federal Communications Commission authorized KMO to go from limited-time to full-time operation along with changes in frequency and power. The station had been on 860 kHz with 500 W power. It changed to 1330 kHz with 250 W power.

The station was assigned the KKMO call letters by the Federal Communications Commission on July 20, 1998. The station had the KKMO calls previously from 1987–1997.

On April 30, 2008, Salem Communications announced that it had reached an agreement to sell KKMO to Tron Do-run Intelli LLC for $3,690,000. The deal was approved by the FCC on June 25, 2008, but in November 2008 Salem announced that the sale had been cancelled.

In November 2008, the station dropped its "Radio Sol" branding in favor of "El Rey".

References

External links
FCC History Cards for KKMO
El Rey Radio Official Website

KMO
Regional Mexican radio stations in the United States
Radio stations established in 1922
1922 establishments in Washington (state)
Radio stations licensed before 1923 and still broadcasting